Anita Skorgan (born 13 November 1958) is a Norwegian singer-songwriter.

Personal life
Born in Gothenburg, Sweden, Skorgan was once married to Jahn Teigen, another successful Norwegian singer-songwriter; constantly in the tabloids, the two were considered the first superstar celebrity couple in Norway. Together they have a daughter.

Career
She represented Norway in the Eurovision Song Contest a total of five times: twice as a solo artist, once with Jahn Teigen, once as his backing singer in 1983, and also as Finn Kalvik's backing singer in his 1981 performance. In 1977 in London she sang "Casanova", finishing 14th. She had a bit more Eurovision success in Jerusalem two years later, lifting her song "Oliver" to 11th place. Back in England, she returned to the Eurovision stage with her then-husband Jahn Teigen to perform "Adieu", which was voted to a 12th position in Harrogate. She and Jahn between them appeared at every single Eurovision Song Contest final from 1977 until 1983 except 1980, namely 6 times in 7 years.

As her music career expanded, the demand for Anita Skorgan grew also.  Before she knew it, she landed multiple appearances on the hit television show "Melodi Grand Prix" seven times between 1976 and 1985. On 17 November 2001 she appeared with her old classmates on the popular Norwegian TV show "Den store klassefesten" (The Big Class Reunion).

Having previously co-written the 1979 and 1983 entries, Skorgan co-wrote Norway's entry at the Eurovision Song Contest in 1988. The song "For vår jord" (For our earth) performed by Karoline Krüger, would give Skorgan her best-ever Eurovision result as a performer or writer, finishing fifth in Dublin. She was also one of the writers of "You Used To Be Mine", which came fifth in Norway's Melodi Grand Prix 1999, the show which selected the country's entry to the 1999 Eurovision Song Contest in Jerusalem.

Additional instances of her filmographic life include appearances on Prima Veras saga om Olav den hellige in 1983 and Stjerner i sikte in 1997.

In 1995 she gave her voice for the singing parts of the Disney movie Pocahontas and its sequel; in 1997 she sang as Anastasia in Anastasia, and in 1998 she sang as Kayley in the movie Quest for Camelot.

In 2004 she founded the band Queen Bees.

In November 2010 she was interviewed and sang live on the Jeremy Vine Show on BBC Radio 2. In July 2011 she was again interviewed, twice, on the Jeremy Vine Show following the 2011 Norway attacks.

Discography
(Peak positions in VG-lista Norwegian Albums or Singles Chart in parenthesis)

Albums
1975: Til en venn
1976: Du er nær meg (#16)
1976: Tänk på mej
1977: Young Girl (#12)
1978: Anita Skorgan
1979: Ingen vei tilbake
1979: Krama dej
1980: De fineste
1981: Pastell (#21)
1983: Cheek to Cheek (with Jahn Teigen) (#1)
1985: Karma (#10)
1986: White Magic (#6)
1990: Basic
1994: Julenatt (#13)
2001: Gull
2008: Julenatt
2009: Hele veien - 47 utvalgte sanger (#4)
2011: På gyllen grunn (#25)
2013: La høsten være som den er (#5)

EPs
1973: Fire klassiske pianostykker
1973: Aufschwung op. 12 nr. 2

MC-Cassettes
1981: Anita Skorgans beste

Singles
1977: "Casanova"(#4)
1979: "Oliver" (#6)
1982: "Adieu" (with Jahn Teigen) (#3)
1983: "Friendly" (with Jahn Teigen) (#2)
2009: "I denne julenatt" (#19)

References

1958 births
Living people
Eurovision Song Contest entrants of 1977
Eurovision Song Contest entrants of 1979
Eurovision Song Contest entrants of 1982
Melodi Grand Prix contestants
Melodi Grand Prix winners
Eurovision Song Contest entrants for Norway
Norwegian women singers
Norwegian pop singers
Norwegian singer-songwriters
Norwegian songwriters